Dean Roberto Gorré (born 10 September 1970) is a Dutch-Surinamese football coach and former player. He was most recently the manager of the Suriname national team.

Playing career
Gorré made his debut on 20 April 1988 for SVV. He also went on to play for the merger club SVV/Dordrecht’90, as well as at Feyenoord, FC Groningen, Ajax, all in the Netherlands and Huddersfield Town, Barnsley and Blackpool in the United Kingdom.

Coaching and managerial career
In 2008–09, he was the assistant first-team coach at Southampton, after previously occupying the same role at Stoke City.

In January 2012, he was appointed head coach at RBC Roosendaal in the Netherlands. Despite a string of negative results during his tenure at the club, the club avoided direct relegation by the end of the season; this was however made redundant later in June after the club was declared bankrupt due to financial troubles.

Gorré had a spell as a youth coach at Ajax before being appointed Scotland national under-17 football team coach in February 2012. He had worked previously with Scottish FA performance director Mark Wotte at Southampton. He left this post for personal reasons in March 2013.

In December 2014 Dean Gorré was appointed head coach of the new proposed professional National squad of his native country Suriname. In February 2015, the appointment was made permanent. He has coached 3 official Surinamese games with 1 win and 2 losses. In February 2016 the SVB said that Dean was no longer manager of Suriname but there were papers saying that Dean still wanted to be coach of Suriname.

In October 2016 Gorré joined Reading as a scout.

In July 2018 Gorré returned as national coach of Suriname. He signed a contract for two years. His goal to enforce Surinamese qualification for the Gold Cup, the championship of North and Central America and the Caribbean, for the first time was achieved. This was made possible via the Concacaf Nations League, which started in September 2018 and by beating Nicaragua 2–1 in the final away groupsmatch.

Gorré has been distinguished by the Surinamese President Desi Bouterse, he was appointed officer in the Honorary Order of the Yellow Star, one of the awards that can also be granted to non-Surinamese. This was for reaching the Gold Cup with the Surinamese squad for the first time ever and happened in the context of the 44th Independence Day that Suriname celebrates on 25 November each year.

Personal life
Gorré has been married to his wife Magali, who is originally from The Hague in the Netherlands, for twenty-one years. Together, they have three sons: Kenji, Quinten and Aidan. All of his three sons play football. Kenji currently plays for Boavista and Aidan is currently in the Manchester City Academy. In November 2015, Gorré and Magali renewed their wedding vows.

His wife, Magali, appeared in The Real Housewives of Cheshire until she announced her departure from the show on 1 March 2016, although a return in future hasn't been ruled out.

Playing statistics

Managerial statistics

References

External links
Profile at Voetbal International

1970 births
Living people
Sportspeople from Paramaribo
Surinamese footballers
Dutch footballers
Surinamese emigrants to the Netherlands
Barnsley F.C. players
Blackpool F.C. players
Huddersfield Town A.F.C. players
Feyenoord players
AFC Ajax players
SV SVV players
FC Dordrecht players
FC Groningen players
Southampton F.C. non-playing staff
RBC Roosendaal managers
English Football League players
Eredivisie players
Eerste Divisie players
Surinamese football managers
Expatriate footballers in England
Surinamese expatriate sportspeople in England
Dutch expatriate sportspeople in England
Dutch football managers
Suriname national football team managers
Association football midfielders
2021 CONCACAF Gold Cup managers